The United States has the second most diplomatic missions of any country in the world after Mainland China, including 166 of the 193 member countries of the United Nations, as well as observer state Vatican City and non-member countries Kosovo and Taiwan. It maintains "interest sections" (in other states' embassies) in member states Afghanistan, Iran and Syria.

History
In December 1777, Morocco became the first nation to seek diplomatic relations with the United States and together they maintain the United States' longest unbroken treaty. Benjamin Franklin established the first overseas mission of the United States in Paris in 1779. On April 19, 1782, John Adams was received by the States-General and the Dutch Republic as they were the first country, together with Morocco and France, to recognize the United States as an independent government. John Adams then became the first U.S. ambassador to the Netherlands and the house that he had purchased there, at Fluwelen Burgwal 18 in The Hague, became the first U.S. embassy anywhere in the world.

In the period following the American Revolution, George Washington sent a number of close advisers, including Thomas Jefferson, John Adams, Francis Dana, and John Jay, to the courts of European potentates in order to garner recognition of U.S. independence, with mixed results. Much of the first fifty years of the Department of State concerned negotiating with imperial European powers over the territorial integrity of the borders of the United States as known today.

The first overseas consulate of the fledgling United States was founded in 1790 at Liverpool, Great Britain, by James Maury Jr., who was appointed by Washington. Maury held the post from 1790 to 1829. Liverpool was at the time Britain's leading port for transatlantic commerce and therefore of great economic importance to the United States.  President George Washington, on November 19, 1792, nominated Benjamin Joy of Newbury Port as the first U.S. Consul to Kolkata (then Calcutta), India.  Joy was not recognized as consul by the British East India Company but was permitted to "reside here as a Commercial Agent subject to the Civil and Criminal Jurisdiction of this Country...".  The first overseas property owned, and the longest continuously owned, by the United States is the American Legation in Tangier, which was a gift of the Sultan of Morocco in 1821.  In general during the nineteenth century, the United States' diplomatic activities were done on a minimal budget.  The U.S. owned no property abroad and provided no official residences for its foreign envoys, paid them a minimal salary, and gave them the rank of ministers rather than ambassadors who represented the great powers—a position which the U.S. only achieved towards the end of the nineteenth century.

In the latter half of the nineteenth century, the State Department was concerned with expanding commercial ties in Asia, establishing Liberia, foiling diplomatic recognition of the Confederate States of America during the American Civil War, and securing its presence in North America. The Confederacy had diplomatic missions in the United Kingdom, France, Belgium, the Papal States, Russia, Mexico, and Spain, and consular missions in Ireland, Canada, Cuba, Italy, Bermuda, and Nassau and New Providence.

The United States' global prominence became evident in the twentieth century, and the State Department was required to invest in a large network of diplomatic missions to manage its bilateral and multilateral relations.  The wave of overseas construction began with the creation of the State Department's Foreign Service Buildings Commission in 1926.

Current missions

Africa
The U.S. has embassies (or, in the case of Seychelles, a Consular Agency) in all states it recognizes with the exceptions of the Comoros, Guinea-Bissau, and São Tomé and Príncipe.

Americas
The U.S. has embassies (or, in the case of Antigua & Barbuda, a Consular agency) in all states it recognizes with the exceptions of Dominica, Saint Kitts and Nevis, Saint Lucia, Saint Vincent and the Grenadines.

Asia
The U.S. has embassies in all countries it recognizes apart from Afghanistan, Bhutan, Iran, Maldives, Syria and Yemen. It has 'interests sections' in other nations' embassies in Afghanistan, Iran, and Syria. It also has a de facto embassy in Taiwan.

Europe
The U.S. has embassies in (or, in the case of Vatican City, near) all countries it recognizes apart from Andorra, Liechtenstein, Monaco, and San Marino.

Oceania
The U.S. has embassies in all countries it recognizes apart from Kiribati, Nauru, Tonga, Tuvalu, and Vanuatu. Kamala Harris announced that 2 new embassies will open in Kiribati and Tonga.

International organizations

Closed missions

Africa

Americas

Asia

Europe

Embassies to open

See also 

 Ambassadors of the United States
 History of United States diplomatic relations by country
 List of countries by number of diplomatic missions
 List of diplomatic missions in the United States
 Terrorist attacks on U.S. diplomatic facilities
 United States Foreign Service

Notes

References 

 Source:

External links 

 State Department
 Details of diplomatic missions of the United States

 
United States
Diplomatic missions of the United States